Koobi is tilapia salted dried fish in Ghana. The fish has an indigenous flavor in stews and soup in the Ghanaian local delicacies. It is used to prepare Ghanaian foods such as fufu, soup, plantain and stew and other local Ghanaian cuisines.

Preparation
Koobi is processed by placing the fresh tilapia in a basin with salt in the fish chest. Use the salt to cover the fish for 3 days. After the 3 days, remove it and dry it in the sun for 5 days or until all the water is drained.

See also

 Ghanaian cuisine
 Ghanaian people
 Chop bar – a traditional eatery in Ghana, mostly located in Southern Ghana
 West African cuisine
 List of African cuisines
 Cuisine

References

Fish dishes
Ghanaian cuisine